A list of Spanish-produced and co-produced feature films scheduled for release in Spain in 2013. When applicable, the domestic theatrical release date is favoured.

Films

Box office 
The five highest-grossing Spanish feature films in 2013, by domestic box office gross revenue, are as follows:

See also 
 28th Goya Awards
List of 2013 box office number-one films in Spain

Informational notes

References

External links
 Spanish films of 2013 at the Internet Movie Database

2013
Lists of 2013 films by country or language